The Corporation des Menuisiers-Ébénistes was a French craft guild which was concerned with the profession of woodmaking.

References

Guilds in France